Henry Tynchiner is recorded as holding the Archdeaconry of Dorset during 1572.

References
 

Archdeacons of Dorset
16th-century English Anglican priests